QMAS may refer to:
 Quality Management and Analysis System, a computer system used by the United Kingdom's National Health Service
 Quality Migrant Admission Scheme, a points-based immigration system in Hong Kong
 Quality Measurement Advisory Service, a non-profit health organisation in the United States
 Queensland Music Awards, an annual music awards event held in Queensland, Australia